King's Meadow, Kings Meadow, or Kingsmeadow, may refer to:

 King's Meadow, Nottinghamshire, a nature reserve in Nottinghamshire, UK
 King's Meadow, Reading, a riverside public park in Reading, UK
 King's Meadow Campus, a campus of the University of Nottingham, UK
 Kings Meadow Island, a former island in the River Tyne, Northumberland, UK
 Kingsmeadow Community Comprehensive School, a school in Gateshead, UK
 Kingsmeadow Stadium, a football stadium in Kingston upon Thames, London, UK